Power Rangers Operation Overdrive is the 2007 season of Power Rangers that tells the story of the Overdrive Rangers' quest to collect the Corona Jewels before four factions of villains collect them first.

Overdrive Rangers
The Operation Overdrive Power Rangers are tasked with tracking down five individual jewels that fit onto Corona Aurora. Due to DNA resequencing, they have enhanced strength and intelligence as well as individual superpowers, and wield the Overdrive Trackers that serve as communicators and mainly morphers. They are funded and run by billionaire Andrew Hartford and are based out of his mansion, located in San Angeles.

Mack Hartford
Mackenzie, short for "Mack", Hartford is the Red Overdrive Ranger, team leader and "son" of Andrew Hartford. He is the only Ranger not deliberately recruited, being involved in Operation Overdrive by accident and against his father's wishes. Outgoing and enthusiastic, he was sheltered by his father for most of his life and had the desire to prove himself. Though initially believed to be genetically enhanced like the other Rangers, he is revealed late in the series to be an android. His memory is linked to the Operation Overdrive computer, so when it's infected with a virus, Mack ends up stuck repeating himself when the virus gets to him.

He is heavily into adventure novels and other escapist fantasies and determined to be a Ranger; he takes failure badly, almost quitting when he fails to protect a civilian. He shows bravery and quick tactical thinking in his first battle and has been quickly accepted and trusted to lead by Andrew and the other Rangers. He has a close relationship with Andrew's assistant, household butler Spencer.

Mack misinterprets Andrew's concern over his status as a Ranger as a lack of confidence as he overheard Andrew and Spencer talking, but soon patches things up with his father as he realizes that the man simply cares about him and is worried about losing him. His "genetic" power is super strength, though it is likely that his robotic components were simply modified. At the end of the series, Mack has a final battle with Flurious and uses all of his energy to destroy him which led directly to his death. The Sentinel Knight uses the Corona Aurora to transform Mack into a full human. Mack then spends his human life the way he always wanted – adventuring with his father.

He and his teammates would later return in Super Megaforce to battle alongside other veteran Ranger teams and assist the Megaforce Rangers.

His primary weapon is the Drive Lance and commands the Dump Driver (Drive Max Zord #1) and Sonic Streaker (Drive Max Zord #10) Zords.

He is portrayed by James Maclurcan and voiced by Nolan North in the Power Rangers: Super Legends video game.

Will Aston
William "Will" Aston is the Black Overdrive Ranger. A suave and cocky spy-for-hire with a bag full of high-tech equipment, he enjoys any chance to prove his skills against sophisticated security devices. He is also a suave ladies' man, a la a younger version of James Bond, who appreciates the finer things in life. He tries to maintain a cooler-than-thou edge, making him the only Ranger not excited about Halloween, as he considered it "kids' stuff."

Used to working alone, he is initially annoyed at having to work in a team and deliberately went off on his own in the Atlantis mission, getting frustrated every time he screws up as a result; he realizes he needs the team when Mack saves his life. Will shows his corrected thinking at the idea of teamwork when he tries to help Tyzonn learn the same lesson. His connection to the team can be seen when he strikes out on his own and risks his life to rescue Ronny, who'd been captured saving him. At the end of the series, he decides to go back to being a spy, except that he will now train a team to work with.

He and the other Rangers later joined forces again in Super Megaforce to help battle the Warstar Armada.

His spy skills have made him a valuable asset; during the search for the Hou-ou Bird, Will pretended to defect to the side of evil in order to retrieve the Bird from Kamdor.

His genetic power is enhanced hearing and "telescopular" vision, his primary weapon is the Drive Slammer, and he commands the Speed (Drive Max Zord #2) and Crane (Drive Max Zord #9) Driver Zords. He later gains a new HoverTek Cycle, (equipped with a land and flight mode).

He is portrayed by Samuell Benta and voiced by Darryl Kurylo in the Power Rangers: Super Legends video game.

Dax Lo
Dax Lo is the Blue Overdrive Ranger. A highly skilled film stuntman, he is unappreciated and ignored in his job; he tends to babble about his previous roles and compare events to films. He adores the jokes, but does not like being left without credit for his work. He is the most enthusiastic of the Overdrive team, enjoying getting to be a real superhero. He used to have a girlfriend named Mira from which he saves her from one of her henchmen, before she is revealed to be the powerful, evil Miratrix. Dax foils her plot at the time and reveals he had suspicions about her early on, but he is nonetheless hurt by the experience. He still believes she harbors feelings for him.

Dax has also shown that he understands his duties of protecting the world, but this hasn't lessened his dream of attaining a true acting career. He is the first to use the Transtek Armor vehicle, which he used against Miratrix, Kamdor and Moltor and their monsters. At the end of the series, he declares that he has had enough of stunt acting, and expresses a desire to direct instead.

He would later return in Super Megaforce alongside his teammates to help battle the Warstar Armada as part of the Ranger army.

His genetic power is super agility (allowing him to jump great heights and at high speeds), his primary weapon is the Drive Vortex, and he commands the Gyro (Drive Max Zord #3) and Cement (Drive Max Zord #8) Driver Zords.

He is portrayed by Gareth Yuen.

Veronica "Ronny" Robinson
Veronica "Ronny" Robinson is the Yellow Overdrive Ranger. She is a top race car driver in a male dominated field, and can hold her own when dealing with the boys. She occasionally shows a tendency to get highly competitive; she annoys the other Rangers by repeatedly showing off when she beats them at games, and has had to be taught that winning isn't everything. She shows extreme joy when faced with the vehicles the Overdrive team will use and attempts to act as driver as much as possible; when exploring areas once morphed, she can be extremely excitable. Ronny is also the usual driver of the SHARC, the Rangers' primary mode of transportation. Although she is one of the toughest fighters on the team, she often serves the damsel in distress role; for example: in Part I of the episodes "Man of Mercury" and "Ronny on Empty", she is captured by the Fearcats.

In "Man of Mercury", Part II, it is she who convinces Tyzonn that he should join the team, explaining to him that the deaths of his previous team were not his fault. She used to have a pair of lucky socks that she'd worn for every race and that had never been cleaned ever; the smell is strong enough to stagger Blothgaar. At the end of the series, Ronny decides to go back to racing.

Ronny later took up her powers again to fight alongside an army of fellow veteran Rangers in Super Megaforce.

Her genetic power is superhuman speed, a power allowing her to pickpocket the fourth jewel from Kamdor. Her primary weapons are the Drive Claws, and she drives the Dozer (Drive Max Zord #4) and Drill (Drive Max Zord #6) Driver Zords.

She is portrayed by Caitlin Murphy.

Rose Ortiz
Rose Ortiz is the Pink Overdrive Ranger. She is a Mensa level genius with an encyclopedic knowledge regarding almost any subject, from geography to the Overdrive equipment. As she herself states, she's "never wrong".

Before joining the team she is building a robot in a University lab in London, as well as writing a paper on Advanced Nuclear Robotics Science, and at Harvard she took a year in Ancient Universal Legends. At the beginning of the series she is shown as a semi punk scene type of girl; later on, she is seen as more of a girly girl. She also claims she learned how to translate morse code by the age of four. Despite her high intelligence, she shows a highly casual nature and is often found chewing something. She is also a highly dangerous fighter, battling Mig on her own and winning but does not destroy him and doing the same with Miratrix and one of Kamdor's monsters.

Growing up so quickly because of her high intelligence, (even skipping most of grade school, starting college at eight years old), Rose didn't have much of a childhood. She mixes zord-based technology with the Sentinel Sword to create a new armor, but mentions it was not safe for humans. Her new armor would be later on used by Mack-an android-as his Battlizer, making him the Red Sentinel Ranger.

At the end of the series, Rose, knowing intelligence is something to be proud of, decides to go back to teaching.

She would return to Ranger duty in Super Megaforce to take part in the final battle against the Warstar Armada.

Her genetic power is invisibility, her primary weapon is the Drive Geyser, and she drives the Sub (Drive Max Zord #5) and Shovel (Drive Max Zord #7) Driver Zords.

She is portrayed by Rhoda Montemayor.

Tyzonn
Tyzonn, sometimes called "Ty" for short, is a Mercurian from the alien planet Mercuria. He is previously a member of the Intergalactic Emergency Responder Squad, a search and rescue team, alongside his fiancée Vella. During an unfortunate accident when his team was killed by the Fearcats after he sent them back into a collapsing cave, Tyzonn dedicates himself to tracking down the criminal group and bringing them to justice for their crimes. He manages to track them to Earth, but his search is cut short when he is confronted by Moltor, who attacks him and transforms him into a Pachycephalosaurus/dragon-like monster form. In exchange for his loyalty, he promises to turn him back to normal. However, Mack realized that he wasn't a villain, and the Rangers worked with him to retrieve the Parchment as well as the Touru Diamond. The power of the two Corona Aurora gems reverted him back to his original form afterwards. When the Fearcats attack anew with extra power granted by Flurious, Tyzonn at first refuses to join the Rangers in battle due to the fear of causing the deaths of another group of friends. However, thanks to Ronny convincing him that his past experiences weren't his fault, he is able to move on and takes the powers of the Mercury Ranger to combat the Fearcats alongside his new team.

He's had some problems adjusting to life on Earth – he annoys Will by trying too hard to be like him. He's shown an interest in learning more about his teammates, trying hard to find out about Rose. He grows a plant in his spare time.

He is reunited with Vella with help from Norg, who rescued her from the Chillers who Flurious had told to destroy him and Vella.

He would later join the Megaforce Rangers to battle against the Armada forces at the end of Super Megaforce.

As a Mercurian, he has the innate natural ability to transform his body into mercury; his primary weapon is the Drive Detector, and he drives an unnamed fire truck Zord (Zord #11) and the Rescue Runner Zords (Zords #12 and #13), which he combines into the Flash Point Megazord.

He is portrayed by Dwayne Cameron.

Zords

DriveMax Zords
Overdrive Rangers individual Zords called DriveMax Zords. DriveMax Zords controls by Overdrive Rangers using their Control Driver.
 Dump Driver: Mack Hartford's personal Zord that forms the main body of most of the Rangers' Megazords. Armed with Claws.
 Speed Driver: Will Aton's personal Zord that is armed with Missiles and Energy Lasers.
 Gyro Driver: Dax Lo's personal Zord armed with a Grappling Cables.
 Dozer Driver: Ronny Robinson's personal Zord armed with a Dozer Shovel.
 Sub Driver: Rose Ortiz's personal Zord that is capable of deep sea searching and armed with Pincers.
 Drill Driver: A giant drilling vehicle with three spiral cones. Originally piloted by Mack Hartford, and then later by Ronny Robinson.
 Shovel Driver: A giant excavator vehicle piloted by Rose Ortiz.
 Cement Driver: A cement mixer and armed with a cannon in its tumbler to spray targets piloted by Dax Lo.
 Crane Driver: A crane truck piloted by Will Aston.
 Sonic Streaker: A fighter jet piloted by Mack Hartford.

Rescue Runners
Rescue Runners are Tyzonn's three individual Zords can form into Flash Point Megazord.
 Fire Truck Zord: Tyzonn's personal Zord that is capable of extinguish fires with high powered water cannons.
 Rescue Runner 1: A rescue aid vehicle.
 Rescue Runner 2: A police vehicle.

BattleFleet Zords
BattleFleet Zords created by Andrew Hartford. BattleFleet Zords can combine into different formations such as battleship mode and Megazord mode.
 BattleFleet Zord 14: A light-armored flying vehicle piloted by Mack Hartford.
 BattleFleet Zord 15: A heavily-armored freighter vehicle piloted by Will Aston.
 BattleFleet Zord 16: A highly maneuverable fighter jet vehicle piloted by Dax Lo.
 BattleFleet Zord 17: An attacker/bomber vehicle piloted by Ronny Robinson.
 BattleFleet Zord 18: A steamroller-like vehicle piloted by Rose Ortiz.

Megazords
 DriveMax Megazord: The combination of Dump Driver, Speed Driver, Gyro Driver, Dozer Driver and Sub Driver. Armed with DriveMax Pick Axe and Drive Digger Shovel can combined into a sword called the Drive Digger Saber Mode.
 Mega Truck: The combination of Dump Driver, Speed Driver, Gyro Driver, Dozer Driver and Sub Driver into a truck form.
 DriveMax Megazord Drill Formation: A combination with the Drill Driver replacing Dozer Driver as its right arm, allowing it to perform a drilling impact attack.
 DriveMax Megazord Shovel Formation: A combination with the Shovel Driver replacing Sub Driver as its left arm, allowing it to perform a shovel punching move.
 DriveMax Megazord Drill & Shovel Formation: A combination with the Drill Driver and Shovel Driver replacing Dozer Driver and Sub Driver as a pair of arms, allowing it to perform a drill and claw attack.
 DriveMax Megazord Cement Formation: A combination with the Cement Driver replacing Sub Driver as its left arm, allowing it to perform a firing cement to immobilize enemies.
 DriveMax Megazord Drill and Cement Formation: A combination with the Drill Driver and Cement Driver replacing Dozer Driver and Sub Driver as a pair of arms, allowing it to perform drill and spinning attacks.
 DriveMax Megazord Crane Formation:  A combination with the Crane Driver replacing Sub Driver as its left arm, allowing it to perform a firing the crane head to snag or punch an enemy.
 DriveMax Megazord Drill and Crane Formation: A combination with the Drill Driver and Crane Driver replacing the Dozer Driver and Sub Driver as a pair of arms, allowing it to perform a lift up the foe and strike them.
 DriveMax Megazord Rescue Formation:  A combination with the Rescue Runner 1 and Rescue Runner 2 replacing the Sub Driver and Dozer Driver as a pair of arms.
 DualDrive Megazord: The combination of Drill Driver, Shovel Driver, Cement Driver, Crane Driver and Sonic Streaker. Its finishers are quadruple blast and firing the head to drill through the enemies.
 Super Drivemax Megazord: The combination of 9 DriveMax Zords.
 DriveMax Ultrazord: The combination of Super DriveMax Megazord with the Sonic Streaker.
 DriveMax Ultrazord Rescue Formation: A combination with the Rescue Runner 1 and Rescue Runner 2 replacing the Drill Driver and Shovel Driver as a pair of arms.
 Flash Point Megazord: The combination of Fire Truck Zord, Rescue Runner 1 and Rescue Runner 2. The finisher is Hydro Blast.
 Flash Point Megazord Drill and Shovel Formation: A combination with the Drill Driver and Shovel Driver replacing Rescue Runner 1 and Rescue Runner 2 as a pair of arms.
 Flash Point Megazord Drill and Cement Formation: A combination with the Drill Driver and Cement Driver replacing Rescue Runner 1 and Rescue Runner 2 as a pair of arms.
 Flash Point Megazord Crane Formation: A combination with the Crane Driver replacing Rescue Runner 1 as its left arm.
 Flash Point Megazord Dozer and Sub Formation: A combination with the Dozer Driver and Sub Driver replacing Rescue Runner 1 and Rescue Runner 2 as a pair of arms. Armed with the Drive Digger Saber Mode.
 BattleFleet Megazord: The combination of 5 BattleFleet Zords. The finishers is the Battlefleet Rollers where the fists spin and detach from its arms to punch its opponent.
 BattleFleet Battleship Formation: The combination of 5 BattleFleet Zords into a giant Battleship form.
 Operation Overdrive Arsenal Ready: The formation that allow the DriveMax Megazord riding the BattleFleet Ship. The finisher is Sentinel Sword.

Allies

Andrew Hartford
Andrew Hartford is a billionaire adventurer who owns several companies and corporations. It was he who unearths the Corona Aurora - after this act, the Guardian of the Crown instructs him on what to do to keep it safe.

Six months later, Mr. Hartford recruits his team of Rangers to help protect the Crown. With his knowledge and wealth, Andrew is able to create Power Ranger technology of his own. Mr. Hartford himself was ready to become the Red Ranger, willing to face the same dangers those he employed would, but his own son Mack has taken the role. Andrew originally tries to prevent this out of concern for Mack's safety but has come to accept it, and when his son suffers from crises of confidence Andrew has encouraged him to remain a Ranger.

Andrew now manages the technical side of the operations. He can be extremely pragmatic.

It is revealed he is keeping something secret about Mack's origins, he states in private that Mack shouldn't have been able to be affected by the bad luck spell, and seems afraid of the possible implications. He later states in that Mack has only arrived two years ago, and before that it has just been him and Spencer. This contradicts Mack's statement in the same episode that he "hadn't been on a picnic in 10 years". It is later revealed that Mack is an android, and that Andrew physically built him a little over two years prior; unable to meet the right woman due to his work, he has decided to play God and make himself a son regardless. To make Mack look like he has a childhood, Andrew and Spencer make some photoshopped pictures.

Andrew Hartford is portrayed by Rod Lousich.

Spencer
Spencer is, and has been for years (he has made a few sarcastic remarks regarding his salary), the loyal butler for the Hartfords. A former member of The Royal Navy, he is more than a mere servant, he is a friend to Mack, Mr. Hartford, and the entire Ranger team, and has been known to drive the team's Overdrive Truck. After monitoring Andrew's adventures and taking care of the team, he can take the position of second-in-command when Andrew's in trouble. Spencer is also sent on missions of his own on occasion, using his impressive disguise skills – he once convincingly disguises himself as Ronny.

Possessing a dry sense of humor, Spencer is not afraid to tell his employer he may be wrong about a course of action (such as initially denying Mack the opportunity of being a Ranger) and understands the Rangers' personalities (such as when he gets Will to break into Hartford's safe by talking about how unbreakable it is, knowing Will can't resist the challenge). He also provides emotional support and the voice of reason in many of the Rangers' personal crisis, including when Mack realizes he isn't human.

Spencer is almost never seen without a feather duster or several glasses of lemonade that he serves.

He is portrayed by David Weatherley.

Sentinel Knight
The Sentinel Knight is the original protector of the Corona Aurora. Millennia ago, after Flurious and Moltor had attempted to steal the Crown, he takes it upon himself to scatter it and its five Jewels into hiding - this is done in order to stop anyone from getting its power again. The guardian hides the crown and the five jewels on a distant, uninhabited planet - this planet, those many millennia ago, is Earth.

He appears to Andrew Hartford after he finds the Corona Aurora and explains to him about the evil that would come and what to do to safeguard the crown. He again appears in order to convince Will, Dax, Ronny and Rose that they were the world's only hope.

The Sentinel Knight made another appearance to congratulate the Rangers on their victory and retrieval of the second gem of the Corona Aurora.

It is revealed he had battled and imprisoned Thrax, the son of villains Rita Repulsa and Lord Zedd - when Thrax returns and disabled the Overdrive Ranger's powers, the Sentinel Knight summons and repowers five veteran Rangers who could temporarily defend the jewels in the current Rangers' place. Initially, the Sentinel Knight seemingly named the Retro Rangers as the Overdrive Rangers' replacements which visibly upset the Overdrive Rangers. However, it proves to not be the case as their link to the Morphing Grid is eventually repaired. After Mack retrieves the sword Excelsior, he gives it to the Sentinel Knight so that no one could use it to harm him and its power restores Sentinel Knight back to physical form - after this restoration, he swiftly vanquish Thrax with his Sentinel Kick. He has since been a valuable ally and fighter, capable of transforming into the powerful Sentinel Sword weapon born from his assimilation of Excelsior.

Thanks to additions by Rose, it is possible for the Sentinel Knight to merge with Mack and turn him into the Red Sentinel Ranger, creating a "Battlizer" armor transformation. He is still sentient in this form and is able to talk to Mack, like Saba and the White Ranger in Mighty Morphin' Power Rangers.

When the jewels and the crown are finally recovered, Sentinel Knight returns to his original form. His final act before departing is using the Corona Aurora to turn Mack into a flesh-and-blood human. He does not appear alongside the Overdrive Rangers during the events of Super Megaforce - why is unknown, it's assumedly that Sentinel Knight is responsible for restoring the Mighty Morphin Power Rangers, Mike Corbett, the second Magna Defender, Ninja Rangers, and Dino Rangers' powers to help the Mega Rangers defeat the Armada once and for all.

The Sentinel Knight is voiced by Nic Sampson who previously played Chip Thorn, the Yellow Mystic Ranger from Power Rangers Mystic Force.

Vella
Vella is Tyzonn's fiancée who worked alongside him as a rescuer. She is originally believed to have been killed in the cave-in caused by the Fearcats but in truth somehow survived.

Crazar mimics her appearance in order to trick Tyzonn into thinking his adventures with the Rangers is merely a dream in order to distract him from helping the Rangers from fighting Benglo, Mig and Agrios - he is able to come to his senses when he finds his morpher, he also realizes that Vella was alive since in order for Crazar to mimic a person's appearance the person he disguised himself as had to be alive - this proves to be true in Nothing to Lose when Moltor is revealed to have kept her prisoner and turned her over to Flurious; while kept prisoner by Flurious Vella befriends Norg, knowing that he is not like Flurious or his minions. When Flurious orders some Chillers to "take care of" Norg and Vella, Norg protects Vella and takes her to safety to the Hartford estate where she is reunited with Tyzonn.

Vella is portrayed by Beth Allen.

Antagonists
The first two groups seen are led by Flurious and Moltor, two brothers who are both after the Corona Aurora gems, who are originally human, but the power of the Corona Aurora transforms them into monster form and scatters them to distant planets. When the Corona was found by Andrew Hartford, the brothers are awoken and attack Earth in a bid to start their search.

The third group is led by ninja warriors Miratrix and Kamdor.

The fourth group are the Fearcats, a duo of cat-like aliens who were cybernetically upgraded by Flurious before they eventually betray him in a desire to become their own faction.

Each of the villainous factions work towards their own goal and as such they very often battle each other while having their own set of monsters.

Flurious
Flurious, originally human and his real name is unknown, has been transformed into a creature made up of ice. He is intelligent enough to create the gyro technology that powers the Fearcats and is incredibly powerful – he went toe-to-toe with Thor himself.

When he and Moltor were children, Flurious broke Moltor's little red sled, much to his brother's dismay. He is short-tempered and irritable, attacking Norg at the slightest provocation. He was the first of the two brothers to openly declare hostilities, attacking Moltor for the Corona Aurora and declaring "it's every man for himself" afterwards. He shows a heavy disdain for his brother (Flurious considers himself the smarter and more handsome one), laughing at his misfortunes and openly calling him to insult his intelligence. He always thinks of Moltor as incompetent, and gets easily annoyed when Moltor fails, although he fails too. One can infer from the verbal exchanges of the two siblings that Flurious is the older brother, though this was never stated onscreen.

Flurious took over Norg's ice cave and enslaved the yeti, and has regretted it ever since. He has tried several times to get Norg to either be useful – such as finding the Fearcat's base and getting him to run away – or leave, but with no luck.

Flurious went to Moltor's base, suggesting that with Miratrix and Kamdor searching for the jewels, it was time for the two brothers to put their differences aside and work together. They did manage to beat the Megazord with the cyborg-zords Moltor built, and capture Mack in the process. But Mack used their own suspicions and past issues to set them against each other, and at the end of the episode they were fighting once more.

Flurious is one of the least active of the villains, and has had the least success as a result. He originally tended to not search for the jewels, and just wait for Moltor to find them so he could steal them. However, with the Fear Cats' debut, his way of thinking soon changed. He briefly attempted to work with other villains: he brought back the Fearcats as cyborgs with his gyro technology, intending for them to work for him, and teamed up with Kamdor to find the Cannon of Ki Amuk. This backfired when the Fearcats turned on him near-instantly and stole one of his robots, and Kamdor and Flurious fell out over whose fault it was. All three villains battled each other as a result, and – aside from Thrax's alliance – this was the last Flurious has tried working with others. The only exception since then came when the Fearcats were destroyed, and Flurious made a one-chance offer to Moltor to work for him; though it is unlikely that he thought his brother would actually take him up on the offer. Flurious gets his hands on the third jewel of the Corona Aurora, thanks to Norg. However, he doesn't show gratitude towards the poor Yeti. Flurious uses the jewel to destroy Moltor's lair, then commits fratricide by luring him to his lair and taking the Corona Aurora before freezing him solid, then shattering him. Using the combined power of the blue sapphire and the crown, Flurious was able to locate the rangers' base where the remaining jewels were hidden.

After an assault on their home Flurious forces the rangers for the rest of the jewels by threatening Mack, Flurious got all the jewels and did not destroy Mack. He then completes the crown and powers up to his ultimate form, a powerful skeletal monster composed of stone and ice called Flurrex. He then begins to bring a new ice age to the planet. During his fight with the rangers, Flurious grows to gigantic size and destroyed the Rangers' 2 Megazords with his massive, super strength by lifting Drivemax Megazord & its Saber, and also the Battlefleet Megazord (in its Battleship mode), with a powerful single blast without even breaking a sweat. Boasting that no human can stop him, Mack (who is an android) decides to face him alone in Battlizer mode while the others face his army of Chillers. Mack defeats Flurious and separates him from the crown. Flurious was a fool for not destroyed Mack sooner when he had the chance. Before Flurious in his weakened state can put the crown back on, Mack picks him up and kills Flurious for good.

He was portrayed by Gerald Urquhart.

Norg
Norg is a Yeti who lives in the cave that Flurious decided to use as a base. He claims to be the last of the Yeti, but has a cousin named Sasquatch who he hasn't talked to in a long time. Extremely dimwitted, to the point where he thinks penguins are trick-or-treaters in costumes, he sees Flurious as his "new friend" even after being blasted (although eventually he realized this treatment was not out of friendship, this could have described Norg as Flurious' pet peeve). He assists in the villain's attempts to retrieve the Aurora gems out of coercion, though he does not appear to be evil himself and is more inclined to goof off on his missions.

He was guarding Mack while Moltor and Flurious attempted to start the DriveMax Megazord. He told Mack the secrets of both brothers and later on used the secrets against them. He finds the bodies of Mig and Benglo and Flurious tries his new gyros out on them and then they come back to life. Norg ran away from Flurious' lair after Flurious caught Norg on his throne then yelled at him for it. He went to Moltor's lair where he gave him Chillers to use and was told to stay. Moltor also had yelled Norg for catching him on his throne as well too. Norg realized and thought that Flurious missed him and after Moltor and his crew were defeated by the Rangers he kicked Norg out of his lair but not before telling Moltor he was glad Flurious broke his sled. Even Flurious in the end was not glad to see Norg either.

He wounded himself and was healed by Tyzonn and Rose; in return, he later used a healing ritual to save Tyzonn's life after the Ranger was wounded by the Fearcats. He proves he is an excellent tracker when he helps the Black Ranger find the Fearcats hideout. Norg tries to prove himself to Flurious by stealing the third jewel from Kamdor. He succeeds, by coincidence, and gives it to Flurious, who despite the efforts of Norg, doesn't thank him or change his perception of him. He then befriends Tyzonn's fiancée, Vella, who sees that he is not like Flurious and his soldiers. Norg also reveals to Vella that he knew Tyzonn. When Flurious completed the corona aurora he instructs his chillers to "Take care" of Vella and Norg, this sends Norg into a fury causing him to destroy all the chillers left behind. He then managed to escape from Flurious' lair with Vella. He is now living with the Hartfords after Spencer found him eating the flowers.

He was portrayed by Kelson Henderson.

Chillers
The Chillers are Flurious' foot soldiers.

Flurious' Monsters
 Temple Monster  - A temple belonging to the lost city of Atlantis underwater where the Rangers were exploring into for a gem, it was brought to the surface. Flurious interrupted their search and made the temple come to life. 
 Flurious' Robot  - A large robot Flurious created with an enlarged Gyro as its power source. Originally Flurious was going to pilot it to retrieve the ancient Cannon of Kiamook, but it was stolen by the Fearcats in an act of betrayal.

Moltor
Moltor, like his brother Flurious, was also originally human and his real name is unknown, but was transformed into a red, fire-elemental dragon-like creature when he attempted to steal the Corona Aurora. When he and Flurious were kids, Flurious broke Moltor's little red sled, resulting in a long-lasting grudge. He considers himself a warrior and is extremely strong, capable of taking on all five Rangers at once. He wields two swords in battle. He is also shown capable of wielding magic, such as turning Tyzonn into a reptilian servant and forcing him to work under him. He's every bit as strong as his brother, having fought him to draw when they first fought (they fight each other in later episodes, but these battles always end in a draw).

He is far more direct and aggressive than his brother; when they arrived on Earth, he attacked the Rangers directly and abducted Andrew Hartford to secure the Corona crown. He is responsible for far more attacks and schemes than Flurious and as a result has seen more success – he gained possession of the Corona and once stole the Compass relic right as the Rangers retrieved it. He is vicious and merciless; in his debut, he unleashed a volcanic eruption on San Angeles merely as a diversion, and in later instance killed some of his Lava Lizards just because he was angry.

His grudge with his brother has left them bitter enemies. He wishes for his brother to respect him, and tried to achieve this by taking control of the weather and flooding the planet. Moltor agrees to Flurious' suggestion that with Miratrix and Kamdor searching for the crown, the two brothers are better off working together. However, Mack used their own suspicions and hatred of each other to set them fighting again. Despite this failed alliance, he later joined forces with the Fearcats and had much more success with them than Flurious did: constructing a Cybernetic Rex capable of defeating the DriveMax Ultrazord, capturing Ronny to use as a power source, and briefly turning the Sentinel Knight evil.

With his volcano lair falling apart due to Flurious' jewel, Moltor decided to lead his lava lizards in an all out attack on the rangers to gain the remaining jewels. Mack arrived to get the crown from Moltor and a vicious battle ensued, which ended when the other rangers came to get Mack out. Barely surviving the battle and the destruction of his lair, Moltor came to Flurious' den with Tyzonn's fiancé, Vella, and the crown. In his weakened state, Flurious was easily able to destroy him and take the crown.

Moltor was featured in Power Rangers: Super Legends. He is the villain faced in the Operation Overdrive section of both versions. In the console version, Moltor even becomes giant and fights the Drivemax Ultrazord.

He was voiced by Mark Ferguson in the TV series and by David Lodge in Power Rangers: Super Legends.

Lava Lizards
The Lava Lizards are a group of red lizard men who are Moltor's foot soldiers. The Lava Lizards are known to survive in lava and in hot conditions.

Moltor's Monsters
Most of Moltor's monsters are based on dinosaurs and/or dragons whether they were enhanced Lava Lizards or giant pilotable cyborgs:

 Giant Sea Creature - A giant cyborg Plesiosaurus monster that emerged from the sea after Andrew Hartford was rescued.
 Weather Machine Monster - Moltor created a weather control device that began to malfunction when its alien technology was introduced to human technology without proper configuration. Thus, the weather control device began to turn the entire area into a frozen wasteland and then assumed a monster form before being destroyed by the Drivemax Megazord.
 Volcan (voiced by James Gaylyn) - Moltor had his Lava Lizards fight each other to the death until only one was standing. That Lava Lizard was transformed into the Salamander/Lava Lizard monster Volcan. Moltor assigned him the job to obtain the Fire Heart scale that was on its way to Andrew Hartford's mansion.
 Moltorzord - A huge dragon/rhinoceros robot that was created and piloted by Moltor. While possessing immense strength, this robot could also fire Gatling gun blasts and chains that can wrap around the enemy.
 Dragonizer - A large Pterodactylus/dragon-like robot that was piloted by Flurious during his truce with Moltor. It wields a boomerang in battle.
 Scaletex (voiced by Patrick Kake) - An armored Lindworm/Velociraptor-like creature sent by Moltor to hunt down Kamdor and Miratrix. He retrieved the Ancient Parchment from them and brought it back to Moltor. He was last seen caught in a cave-in during a fight with Kamdor and Miratrix.
 Tyzonn Monster (voiced by Dwayne Cameron) - Moltor turned a Mercurian named Tyzonn into a Pachycephalosaurus/dragon-like creature upon defeating him and later used him to obtain a parchment from the Rangers.
 Bullox (voiced by Will Wallace) - A four-eyed bull/Nāga creature sent to assist Tyzonn in obtaining the parchment. He wields a crescent-tipped scepter in battle and he can breathe fire.
 Lavadactyls - A trio of Tupuxuara-like that were each piloted by a Lava Lizard. They can shoot lasers from their mouths.
 Blothgarr (voiced by Charlie McDermott) - A red Chinese Dragon-like monster who is an old friend of Moltor. He was given a luck-altering compass that Moltor stole from the Rangers. He can breathe fire and bring down red lightning from the skies.
 Cybernetic Rex - A robotic Tyrannosaurus/Allosaurus monster in battleship-like armor created and piloted by Moltor. It can bite, shoot lasers from its cannons, and it also has the ability to launch swarms of Lavadactyls.
 Magmador (voiced by Mark Wright) - A Styracosaurus/dragon-like monster with tentacles for a left hand. This monster accompanied Moltor in obtaining the Tri-Dragon Key in Japan where his tentacles were used to track down the Tri-Dragon Key. He can turn his tentacles into replicates of the Rangers' weapons.

Kamdor
Kamdor is Miratrix's master. He is trapped inside a jewel that Miratrix wears around her neck after he saves her on a distant planet and is eventually released by a device Will steals for Miratrix (while undercover). He wields two swords that can combine to form a double-bladed naginata and can create monsters and enlarge them using sutras. He has no foot soldiers, but once brainwashed ninja-garbed stunt men at a movie set into serving him.

He battles both the Rangers and other villains in his search for the jewels; he has clashed with Moltor and the Fearcats several times. He has briefly worked with Flurious and was part of Thrax's army (teaming up with Mig to attack Stonehenge), but his alliances are brief and don't last. He has clashed with Will several times, first when the Ranger was pretending to defect to evil (Kamdor never trusted him), again to steal the third jewel. Finally he accuses Will of constantly failing in the last episode showing a specific contempt of him, and was quite surprised to find how strong Will really was in their final clash.

He and Miratrix have had greater success than most of their rival villains in searching for the jewels, mostly due to the fact that they are more covert than the other villains who mostly use brute force. They were able to steal the Parchment left behind by the Ho-Oh bird, the third jewel of the Corona Aurora, and located and gained the fourth jewel (though Ronny used her superspeed to pickpocket it from him).

He had a strong partnership with Miratrix. Aside from being imprisoned saving her life, he had shown an amiable working relationship with her. When she was knocked flying by the Fearcats, he sounded genuinely concerned. However, he still didn't view her as an equal and left her out of the details of some of his plans – he organized an alliance with Flurious without her, and he was shown not informing her of the plan in advance and sending her against the Rangers while he searched for the jewel, even though she technically wasn't needed. The relationship had collapsed, and he told her that he was wrong 'to think she could be more than she is', dismissing her as a "worthless greedy underling".

He was shown to be increasingly irate about losing to the Rangers, and angrily beat the Mercury Ranger into unconsciousness. At the end of the 2-parter, Home and Away; after the Fearcats's deaths, he declared to Miratrix he was tired of the failures and "it's time to make our final move".

Later he made his final move in waiting for the Rangers to do the hard work and then attacking with sudden force, successfully stealing the Golden Plate that led to the fifth jewel. He also imprisoned Miratrix in the jewel that had once held him. He used the third jewel to summon a meteor to Earth as a diversionary tactic, and Will had to face Kamdor in a solo duel while the other Rangers handled the meteor. During this, time Kamdor switched to his Duel Mode where his mask parts gave way to reveal his true, gray monstrous face. Kamdor, deliberately taking this battle "to the end", was eventually destroyed by the Black Ranger, and the Plate was retrieved.

He was voiced by Adam Gardiner (though Richard Simpson had been credited as Kamdor in "Pirate in Pink").

Miratrix
Miratrix was first shown in her human disguise of Mira. Faking a monster attack for Dax to save her from, she managed to become his girlfriend and used this position to gain the Sword of Neptune scrolls. She slipped up by mentioning the Rangers' quest for the jewels, about which Dax had never told her; as a result, she was tricked into stealing a fake scroll and her plan was thwarted.

Miratrix has served Kamdor loyally after he was imprisoned saving her life, and together they search for the Corona jewels. She is a dangerous warrior, facing the Rangers with her hand-to-hand and tantō sword skill. She was attracted to Will when he pretended to defect, and was angered when she discovered it had been an act.

She's shown the ability to go undercover – Miratrix disguised herself as an aid from the Mayor of San Angeles' office in order to give them Kamdor's fake medals to immobilize the new Mercury Ranger. She went undercover in Egypt and was able to overhear information the Rangers were given without being noticed.

She had a strong partnership with Kamdor and was always at his side, serving him loyally. She seemed very friendly with him, but she was once frustrated by not being let in on his plans and being dispatched against the Rangers while he searched for the fourth jewel. She appeared to have believed she was considered an equal, whereas he actually treated her as a trusted subordinate. Finally after an unsuccessful attempt at reclaiming the Octavian Chalice from the rangers, Kamdor told Miratrix he was tired of her failures and stated she was only an underling and he'd been a fool to believe she could be more.

In retaliation, an upset Miratrix interrupted the ceremony the Rangers were holding involving the Chalice, attempting to gain its power. She was transformed into a giant owl-like monster thanks to its energy, and in this form had enough power to take down the BattleFleet Megazord until Tyzonn and Ronny managed to break her connection to the Chalice. After being defeated by the Rangers and reverting to her normal form, Kamdor arrived without warning to exploit the situation. He revealed he had been using her to do just what she had done, and after letting Miratrix have a moment of despair, he imprisoned her in the jewel he had originally been sealed in.

Whether Kamdor had the jewel at the time of his eventual destruction is unknown, though Flurious stated that Miratrix was also destroyed.

She was portrayed by Ria Vandervis.

Kamdor's Monsters
Most of the monsters that Kamdor creates look like they are made up of two items:

 Ultrog (voiced by Richard Simpson) - A Lock/data disk monster that assisted Miratrix in obtaining the Neptune Scrolls.
 Bombardo - An arquebus/factory object monster summoned by Kamdor from an abandoned pirate ship cannon. He was sent alongside Miratrix to obtain the Eye of the Sea.
 Big Mouth Monster (voiced by Mark Williams) - A purse/vacuum cleaner monster created by Kamdor from a blue purse that was on a picnic blanket.
 Camera Monster - A dark clay/camera monster created by Kamdor from a movie camera.
 Amplifier Monster - A fire stove bellow/loudspeaker monster created by Kamdor from a loudspeaker.
 Top Hat - A top hat/animal picture book monster created by Kamdor from a silk top hat. He seemed to act and be referred to as a magician.
 Generalissimo - A sextant/chalk monster that assisted Kamdor and Miratrix in a museum robbery to steal a gem that they thought was a Corona Aurora jewel.
 Datum (voiced by Gerald Urquhart) - A computer/good luck charm monster created by Kamdor from a computer. He created a computer virus that infected the BattleFleet Zords, the Ranger's base computers and Mack himself (who turned out to be an android).
 Garbage Monster - A bowling ball-headed monster with a body of multiple other items such as a Japanese war fan, an air conditioner, and other garbage. It was summoned by Kamdor alongside four other monster to fight the Rangers so that Kamdor can retrieve the Star of Isis. He wields a bowling pin in battle.
 Golem Monster - A mechanical golem monster that was summoned by Kamdor to fight the Rangers so that Kamdor can retrieve the Star of Isis.
 Statue Monster - A samurai statue monster that was summoned by Kamdor to fight the Rangers so that Kamdor can retrieve the Star of Isis. He can shoot beams from his eyes and wields a sword.
 Kunoichi Monster - A winged kunoichi monster was summoned by Kamdor alongside other monsters to fight the Rangers while he took the Star of Isis. She wielded two large swords in battle.
 Prince Monster - A prince monster with glass slippers on the sides of his head that was summoned by Kamdor to fight the Rangers so that Kamdor can retrieve the Star of Isis. He wielded a rapier in battle.

The Fearcats
The Fearcats were the last members of a dangerous race of demonic, feline extraterrestrials running free in the universe. They were malicious, and their debut episode showed that they enjoyed destroying things and hurting people just to show that they could. They also had a personal history with Tyzonn - they deliberately killed his teammates for fun, after Tyzonn had sent them into a mine to rescue the workers from the Fearcats, who he thought were trapped. As natural Fearcats they had the ability to grow by ripping off their skin.

Originally Mig and his partner Cheetar came to Earth to find and use the jewels of the Corona Aurora to free their kind from the Prison Mirror, but after becoming impatient they captured Ronny and used her Overdrive Tracker instead. As a result, Benglo was freed before the Prison Mirror itself was destroyed by Tyzonn, which in turn also permanently trapped the remaining Fearcats imprisoned within. Cheetar then sacrificed himself to save the two stronger Fearcats by using the last of his strength to grow and confront the Rangers' Zords in a battle to the death. The two remaining Fearcats would also later be killed when they attempted to use the same tactic, but, unlike Cheetar, they were not completely destroyed when struck down.

Norg discovered their lifeless bodies and Flurious revived them as cyborgs using his gyro technology. Using their enhanced powers they almost killed the Rangers in the first few confrontations until Tyzonn stepped in as the Mercury Ranger. Though Flurious originally intended for the Fearcats to serve him, the duo betrayed him by stealing the giant robot he built and struck out on their own. They decided to find the Corona jewels to fulfil their own ambitions and eliminate Tyzonn for the destruction of their Fearcat army. They were stronger than before now that they were cyborgs, and used the very same technology to fashion their own giant robots.

The only other remaining Fearcat, Crazar, joined her cybernized comrades in search for the Octavian Chalice; using it in conjunction with three other relics (which they stole from the rival villains), they created the titantic cyborg-golem Agrios and almost succeeded in destroying the Rangers. Agrios eventually fell to combined Zord firepower and all three Fearcats were taken out by the Rangers.

Out of all the rangers, (excluding Tyzonn), the Fearcats seem to despise Ronny Robinson, the Yellow Ranger the most due to capturing her twice. "Man of Mercury, Part I" and "Ronny on Empty, Part I".

Mig
Mig is a snow leopard-like Fearcat could conjure up a bazooka-like weapon. Mig had a rivalry with Tyzonn, being the one responsible for killing his rescue team. As a cyborg, he was now armed with two pistols that double as short swords, and he possessed far more power. Mig seemed to be the cockier of the two and acted a little immature in battle and was the one most often seen in battle against the Rangers. He once came close to killing Tyzonn, but was beaten back by an Rose. In "Once a Ranger," he was impressed with Kamdor's knowledge of Stonehenge when they were sent there to look for the Corona Aurora gems. Following Agrios' defeat, he engaged Tyzonn in a single combat in the Top of the Mountains of the Skilled combat and was destroyed by the Mercurian.

He was voiced by Kelson Henderson.

Benglo
Benglo is a Bengal tiger-like Fearcat was trapped inside the prison mirror until Cheetar and Mig freed him. As a cyborg, his power was great and he was armed with a sword/shotgun weapon. Benglo seemed to be very serious, acting as a foil to Mig's impulsive nature, and left most of the fighting to Mig while he piloted their various giant robots. After Agrios was defeated, he fought the five main Rangers while Mig battled Tyzonn. After witnessing the demise of his partner Benglo vowed vengeance, but before he could enact it he too met his end when he was destroyed by the Red Sentinel Ranger.

He was voiced by David Weatherley.

Cheetar
Cheetar, who has a short violent temper, is a cheetah-like Fearcat who comes to earth with Mig to search for the jewels of the Corona Aurora in an attempt to free their army from the prison mirror. Cheetar and Mig capture Ronny and successfully manage to free Benglo from the mirror, only for it to be destroyed by Ronny and Tyzonn, thus destroying the other Fearcats still sealed within. Later on, Cheetar takes the hit from the Drill Blaster for Mig and Benglo. He then uses the last of his energy to enlarge himself and is destroyed by the DriveMax Ultrazord. He is based on Tor The Shuttlezord from Mighty Morphin Power Rangers.

He was voiced by James Gaylyn.

Crazar
Crazar was a female wolf-like Fearcat, who was thought to have been killed in the same cave-in that Mig caused to kill Tyzonn's teammates and fiancé Vella long ago. Tyzonn stated that she was "worse than Mig and Benglo", and she showed a sadistic delight in tormenting him over Vella's apparent demise. Actually, Vella is alive; Crazar had somehow placed her in Moltor's custody, and had developed the ability to replicate the Mercurian's form, seemingly just to use it against Tyzonn. She also had the power to create highly realistic illusions.

Upon arriving on Earth she teamed up with Mig and Benglo and helped them obtain the Octavian Chalice. During her fight with the DualDrive Megazord, Tyzonn had attempted to destroy her completely with an ancient Mercurian spell. It failed and Crazar resurfaced. She impersonated Tyzonn's fiancé Vella and created an illusion of Mercuria, trying to convince Tyzonn that everything since the cave-in had been a dream so he had to be kept out of the way of the other Fearcats. Crazar's cover was eventually and unintentionally blown by Spencer and she was destroyed for good in a vicious battle against Tyzonn.

She was voiced by Lori Dungey.

Fearcats' Monsters
Most of the Fearcats' monsters are giant robots that can be piloted by the Fearcats:

 Jet Robot - A giant jet-themed robot piloted by Mig and Benglo.
 Commando Robot - A giant commando-themed robot piloted by Mig and Benglo. It was briefly powered by the Super Armor.
 Centurion Robot - A giant battle helicopter-themed robot piloted by Mig and Benglo. It was powered by the Centurion Torch.
 Agrios - A gigantic powerful homunculus monster that was created by the Fearcats after they mixed Minerva's Staff, The Root of Hesper, and The Sands of Sila inside the Octavian Chalice (after stealing each of them from Moltor, Flurious, and Kamdor). The Fearcats were able to harness the monster's abilities like a giant robot after they attached their own robotic armor with their cockpit in it.

Thrax
Thrax is the son of Mighty Morphin Power Rangers villains Rita Repulsa and Lord Zedd, and the grandson of Master Vile. He appears as the main villain in the "Once a Ranger" episodes. Thrax inherited most of his appearance from his father, it seems, due to his physical appearance and Z-Staff. His powers seem to be similar to those of his father. His mother's appearance isn't apparent, except that he has a part-humanoid (similar to Grimlord from VR Troopers) face, and torn cloth-like orange ornaments wrapped around his horns. One similarity to his mother is that he too was imprisoned in a space dumpster. His jawbone resembles that of his maternal uncle, Rito Revolto from Mighty Morphin Power Rangers, and has a skeletal spinal column, a combination resembling his father and uncle. His shoulder pads and chest armor are similar to Zeltrax from Power Rangers Dino Thunder.

Thrax is imprisoned by the Sentinel Knight in a space dumpster, much like Zordon had done to his mother pre-Mighty Morphin Power Rangers. He grows stronger as the Sentinel Knight grows weaker and is able to escape as his mother did on the moon, and now he seeks revenge on the Sentinel Knight. Angry at his parents for becoming good and wanting to restore their evil legacy, he unites the four Overdrive villain groups into an alliance to destroy the Overdrive Rangers. The combined factions successfully defeat the Rangers easily by breaking their link to the Universal Morphing Grid, stripping them of their powers. When the Sentinel Knight responds by creating a team of veteran Rangers, Thrax decides to seek out the magical sword Excelsior to destroy him, following Mack Hartford right to it. However, because of Thrax's evil nature, he is unable to claim the sword and retreats to continue his rampage. He proves to be a strong fighter in the final battle, managing to overpower the Defender Vest, before being beaten aside by Adam Park. Thrax is finally vanquished by the newly (and fully) restored Sentinel Knight with his sentinel kick, causing the other villains to retreat and continue their rivalry. His father's Z-Staff is collected by Ryjack in Power Rangers Beast Morphers. Years later, Thrax's father had returned and retrieves his staff after his son's defeat in Power Rangers Dino Fury. 

He was portrayed by Glen Levy.

Vulturus
Vulturus is a vulture/dragon-like monster created by Thrax. Supposedly according to Thrax, he is invincible or was thought to be. He is grown and sent to attack the Rangers in their Megazords only to be destroyed by Mack using Excelsior. Later, he was found weakened, but in one piece by the villains. Flurious managed to restore his strength and upgrade him with a Gyro into the more human-like Vulturus Maximus. In this second form, he was destroyed by the Mercury Ranger's Drive Detector.

Notes

References

External links
 Official Power Rangers Website
 Power Rangers Operation Overdrive - Blue Sapphire Volume 3
 

Operation Overdrive
Power Rangers Operation Overdrive
Power Rangers Operation Overdrive